Naya Mandir (lit. New Temple) is a historic Jain temple in Old Delhi in India, in the Dharampura locality allocated to the Jain community by Aurangzeb.

History

Raja Harsukh Rai, a treasurer in the Mughal Empire during the late Mughal period, constructed a large and ornate Jain temple in the Dharampura locality of Old Delhi in 1807 during the rule of Mughal Emperor Akbar II with a cost of about 8 Lakh rupees, then an enormous amount. He was able to obtain the royal permission to construct a shikhara for the temple for the first time during the Mughal rule. Thus temple is known as the Naya Mandir (new temple), since an older Jain temple, now known as the Lal Mandir already existed.

When the temple construction was almost finished, Harsukh Rai stopped the construction. When the representatives of the Agrawal Jain community approached him and asked about it, he claimed that he has run out of money and needed donations from the community to finish the construction. After accepting modest donations, Harsukh Rai declared the temple to be panchayati (i.e. belonging to the community, rather than himself) and finished the construction.

During the festivities of temple consecration (Panch-kalyanak Pratishtha), the festive pandal was raided by a local group and the gold and silver objects (chhatra, chamar, utensils) were plundered. Harsukh Rai complained to the Emperor, who ordered that they be returned.

The temple houses an important collection of manuscripts.

The Naya Mandir Maha-purana manuscript

The Naya Mandir book collection includes a rare illustrated manuscript of Maha-purana of Acharya Jinasena. This manuscript dated to 1420 CE is a rare surviving example of Jain (and Indian) art in early 15th century.

Accounts of Nineteenth-century visitors

After the 1857 Ghadar and during the early 20th century, this was the temple referred to as the Jain temple of Delhi by several European visitors.

E. Augusta King in 1884 describes the temple as:

The frontage: The Jain temple has a fine frontage of carved stone, carved so profusely in such delicate airy tracery that it is difficult to believe it is stone. We went up a flight of steps and came to a courtyard surrounded by what we call Moorish arches, with colonnades having groined roofs, every inch of which was painted elaborately with graceful arabesques, the effect being rich and soft in the extreme.

The decorations: On one side of the courtyard is the temple proper, on a raised dais four feet high. The building and decorations are exquisite; the shafts of all the arches are of polished white marble inlaid with flowing flowery patterns in coloured marbles. The walls and ceiling and every available inch are painted richly, the prevailing colours being blue and gold, but all so artistically blended that the eye only takes in the general effect, which is something like that of a Cashmere shawl.

The central shrine: In the centre, under the dome, is a very beautiful shrine for the idol, who is sitting serenely at a height of ten feet or so under a fine baldachino of white inlaid marble. If the whole could be transported to Italy, and a statue of the Virgin substituted for the idol, its beauty would be raved about. A sparrow was perched familiarly on the shrine, and gave us some little friendly chirps to show he did not object to our presence.

Some visitors describe the shrine as a "large wedding-cake".

James Fergusson, in his famous "History of Indian and Eastern Architecture" (1876)  describes the temple as:

 "There is one other example that certainly deserves notice before leaving this branch of the subject, not only on account of its beauty, but its singularity. .. It was left, however, for a Jaina architect of the end of the last or beginning of this century, in the Mahomodan city of Delhi, to suggest a mode by which what was only conventionally beautiful might really become an appropriate constructive part of lithic architecture. .. As will be observed in the last cut (No. 146), the architect has had the happy idea of filling in the whole of the back of the strut with pierced foliaged tracery of the most exquisite device.."

Concealed chamber

At one time many Jain temples contained a concealed chamber (sometimes called bhonyra भोंयरा )to preserve statues during troubled times to hide them. Naya Mandir also has a concealed chamber. A visitor in 1876 described it:

 In Delhi I found a Jain temple which was wholly unknown to Europeans well acquainted with the city; and on prosecuting inquiry, I got its priest to open to me a concealed chamber containing large statues of several of the Tirthankaras richly ornamented.

The chamber has now been given the form of a cave, suitable for peaceful meditation by visiting Jain monks.

Nearby Jain temples in the Dharampura/Dariba

 Jain Chetyalaya, Gali khazanchimal, Dariba Kalan, Delhi-110 006
 Jain Chetyalaya,  Satghara, Dharampura Delhi-110 006
 Jain Meruji Mandir,  Dharampura Delhi-110 006
 Jain Panchayati Mandir.  Dharampura Delhi-110 006
 Jain Chetyalaya,  Gali kuanwali, Gali Anar, Dharampura Delhi-110 006
 Jain Padhmawati purwal Mandir,  Dharampura Delhi-110 006
 Jain Bada Mandir,  Kucha Seth, Dariba kalan Delhi-110 006
 Shree Sumati Nath Ji Shree Swatember Jain Mandi,  Naughara
 Jain Bada Mandir,  Dharampura Delhi-110 006
 Jain Chetyalaya,  Deputy Mal Ji Jain, Dharampura Delhi-110 006

Chetyalayas are generally small private temples.

Gallery

See also

 Sri Digambar Jain Lal Mandir
 Raja Harsukh Rai
 Jainism in Delhi

References

Jain temples in Delhi
Central Delhi district
Buildings and structures completed in 1807
1807 establishments in British India
19th-century Jain temples